Kwankhao is a Thai Muay Thai fighter. He currently is an instructor at Evolve MMA in Singapore.

Titles and accomplishments

 2014 Thailand 130 lbs Champion
 2015 Rajadamnern Stadium 130 lbs Champion

Fight record

|-  style="background:#cfc;"
| 2016-08-16 || Win ||align=left| Celestin Mendes  || Fighting Man || China || Decision || 5 || 3:00
|-  style="background:#fbb;"
| 2015-10-30 || Loss||align=left|  Petpanomrung Kiatmuu9  || Toyota Vigo Marathon Tournament 2015, Final || Nakhon Ratchasima, Thailand || Decision || 3 || 3:00
|-
! style=background:white colspan=9 |For the Toyota Vigo Marathon Tournament title.-64 kg
|-  style="background:#cfc;"
| 2015-10-30 || Win ||align=left| Kaimukkao Por.Thairongruangkamai  || Toyota Vigo Marathon Tournament 2015, Semi Final || Nakhon Ratchasima, Thailand || Decision || 3 || 3:00
|-  style="background:#cfc;"
| 2015-10-30 || Win ||align=left| Cody Moberly  || Toyota Vigo Marathon Tournament 2015, Quarter Final || Nakhon Ratchasima, Thailand || Decision || 3 || 3:00
|-  style="background:#cfc;"
| 2015-08-11 || Win ||align=left| Muangthai PKSaenchaimuaythaigym || Petchyindee Fight Fight, Lumpinee Stadium || Bangkok, Thailand || Decision || 5 || 3:00
|-  style="background:#cfc;"
| 2015-07-10 || Win||align=left| Petpanomrung Kiatmuu9   ||  Wanweraphon Fight, Lumpinee Stadium || Bangkok, Thailand || Decision || 5 || 3:00
|-  style="background:#cfc;"
| 2015-06-11 || Win ||align=left| Phetmorakot Petchyindee Academy || Rajadamnern Stadium || Bangkok, Thailand || Decision || 5 || 3:00
|-  style="background:#cfc;"
| 2015-05-03 || Win ||align=left|  Yodtuantong PetchyindeeAcademy || Rangsit Stadium || Thailand || Decision || 5 || 3:00
|-  style="background:#fbb;"
| 2015-04-02 || Loss||align=left| Petpanomrung Kiatmuu9  || Wanmitchai + Petchviset Fight, Rajadamnern Stadium || Bangkok, Thailand || Decision || 5 || 3:00
|-  style="background:#fbb;"
| 2015-03-06 || Loss||align=left| Phetmorakot Petchyindee Academy || Lumpinee Stadium || Bangkok, Thailand || Decision || 5 || 3:00
|-  style="background:#cfc;"
| 2015-02-05 || Win ||align=left| Phetmorakot Petchyindee Academy || Rajadamnern Stadium || Bangkok, Thailand || Decision || 5 || 3:00 
|-
! style=background:white colspan=9 |
|-  style="background:#cfc;"
| 2014-12-28 || Win ||align=left| Phetpanomrong Mor.Ratanabandit || Rangsit Stadium || Thailand || Decision || 5 || 3:00
|-  style="background:#cfc;"
| 2014-11-25|| Win ||align=left| Phet Utong Or. Kwanmuang || Lumpinee Stadium || Bangkok, Thailand || Decision || 5 || 3:00
|-  style="background:#cfc;"
| 2014-11-02|| Win ||align=left| Yodtuanthong Petchyindee || Rangsit Stadium || Rangsit, Thailand || Decision || 5 || 3:00
|-  style="background:#fbb;"
| 2014-09-07 || Loss||align=left| Dejnarong Wor.Sunthornon || Rangsit Stadium || Rangsit, Thailand || Decision || 5 || 3:00
|-  style="background:#cfc;"
| 2014-07-08 || Win||align=left| Kaimukkao Por.Thairongruangkamai || Lumpinee Stadium || Bangkok, Thailand || Decision || 5 || 3:00
|-  style="background:#c5d2ea;"
| 2014-06-11 || Draw||align=left| Kaimukkao Por.Thairongruangkamai || Rajadamnern Stadium || Bangkok, Thailand || Decision || 5 || 3:00
|-  style="background:#cfc;"
| 2014-05-06 || Win||align=left| Kaimukkao Por.Thairongruangkamai || Lumpinee Stadium || Bangkok, Thailand || Decision || 5 || 3:00
|-
! style=background:white colspan=9 |
|-  style="background:#fbb;"
| 2014-02-28 || Loss ||align=left| Phetmorakot Petchyindee Academy || Lumpinee Stadium || Bangkok, Thailand || Decision || 5 || 3:00 
|-
! style=background:white colspan=9 |
|-  style="background:#cfc;"
| 2014-01-24 ||Win||align=left| Dechnarong Wor Suntoranon || Lumpinee Stadium || Bangkok, Thailand || Decision || 5 || 3:00
|-  style="background:#cfc;"
| 2014-01-03 ||Win||align=left| Pornsanae Sitmonchai || Lumpinee Stadium || Bangkok, Thailand || KO (elbow)|| 3 ||
|-  style="background:#cfc;"
| 2013-11-29 ||Win||align=left| Chatchainoi Sor Prasopchoke || Lumpinee Stadium || Bangkok, Thailand || Decision || 5 || 3:00
|-  style="background:#fbb;"
| 2013-10-11 || Loss||align=left| Sam-A Gaiyanghadao || Lumpinee Stadium || Bangkok, Thailand || Decision || 5 || 3:00
|-  style="background:#cfc;"
| 2013-09-21 || Win||align=left| Karim Bennoui || La Nuit des Challenges 12 || Saint-Fons, France || Decision || 5 || 3:00
|-  style="background:#cfc;"
| 2013-09-03 ||Win||align=left| Pornsanae Sitmonchai || Lumpinee Stadium || Bangkok, Thailand || TKO (cuts)|| 4 ||
|-  style="background:#cfc;"
| 2013-07-05 ||Win||align=left|  Saksuriya Kaiyanghadao || Lumpinee Stadium || Bangkok, Thailand || Decision || 5 || 3:00
|-  style="background:#cfc;"
| 2013-05-17 ||Win||align=left|  Newwangjan Pagonponsurin || Lumpinee Stadium || Bangkok, Thailand || Decision || 5 || 3:00
|-  style="background:#fbb;"
| 2013-04-10 ||Loss||align=left|  Saksuriya Kaiyanghadao || Rajadamnern Stadium || Bangkok, Thailand || Decision || 5 || 3:00
|-  style="background:#fbb;"
| 2013-02-22 || Loss ||align=left| Pornsanae Sitmonchai || Rajadamnern Stadium || Bangkok, Thailand || Decision || 5 || 3:00
|-  style="background:#fbb;"
| 2013-01-08 || Loss ||align=left| Kangkenlek SBP Car Network || Rajadamnern Stadium || Bangkok, Thailand || Decision || 5 || 3:00
|-  style="background:#fbb;"
| 2012-11-03 || Loss||align=left| Pornsanae Sitmonchai || || Thailand || TKO || 3 ||
|-  style="background:#cfc;"
| 2012-10-02 ||Win||align=left| Nontakit Tor.Morsi  || Lumpinee Stadium || Bangkok, Thailand || KO (Left Elbow) || 4 ||
|-  style="background:#fbb;"
| 2012-09-04 ||Loss||align=left| Tingthong Chor Kowyuha-isuzu || Lumpinee Stadium || Bangkok, Thailand || Decision || 5 || 3:00
|-  style="background:#fbb;"
| 2012-07-31 ||Loss||align=left|  Palangtip Nor.Sripueng || Lumpinee Stadium || Bangkok, Thailand || Decision || 5 || 3:00
|-  style="background:#fbb;"
| 2012-05-25 ||Loss||align=left| Yodkhunpon Sitmonchai || Lumpinee Stadium || Bangkok, Thailand || KO (Punches)||  ||
|-  style="background:#cfc;"
| 2012-05-02 ||Win ||align=left| Rungpetch Kiatjaroenchai || Rajadamnern Stadium || Bangkok, Thailand || Decision || 5 || 3:00
|-  style="background:#fbb;"
| 2012-04-03 ||Loss||align=left| Yodkhunpon Sitmonchai || Lumpinee Stadium || Bangkok, Thailand || Decision || 5 || 3:00
|-  style="background:#cfc;"
| 2012-02-16 ||Win||align=left| Yodpetch Wor.Sangprapai  || Rajadamnern Stadium || Bangkok, Thailand || KO || 4 ||
|-  style="background:#fbb;"
| 2012-01-06 ||Loss||align=left| Rungpetch Kiatjaroenchai || Lumpinee Stadium || Bangkok, Thailand || Decision || 5 || 3:00
|-  style="background:#cfc;"
| 2011-10-25 ||Win||align=left|  Kaotam Lookprabaht || Lumpinee Stadium || Bangkok, Thailand || Decision || 5 || 3:00
|-  style="background:#cfc;"
| 2011-09-30 ||Win||align=left| Lookman Fonjarngchonburee|| Lumpinee Stadium || Bangkok, Thailand || KO (Right Elbow) || 2 ||
|-  style="background:#cfc;"
| 2011-07-28 ||Win||align=left| Mapichit Sitsongpeenong || Rajadamnern Stadium || Bangkok, Thailand || Decision || 5 || 3:00
|-  style="background:#cfc;"
| 2011-06-21 ||Win||align=left|  Bunluedetch Sor.Prasobchok || Rajadamnern Stadium || Bangkok, Thailand || Decision || 5 || 3:00
|-  style="background:#fbb;"
| 2011-03-16 ||Loss||align=left|  Orono Yor.Yong|| Rajadamnern Stadium || Bangkok, Thailand || Decision || 5 || 3:00
|-  style="background:#cfc;"
| 2011-01-26 ||Win||align=left|  Riangphet Phetfergus || Rajadamnern Stadium || Bangkok, Thailand || Decision || 5 || 3:00
|-  style="background:#cfc;"
| 2011-01-05 ||Win||align=left|  Kumarntae Lookprabaht	 || Rajadamnern Stadium || Bangkok, Thailand || Decision || 5 || 3:00
|-  style="background:#cfc;"
| 2010-08-10 ||Win||align=left|  Nokkrajib Sitporadd || Lumpinee Stadium || Bangkok, Thailand || Decision || 5 || 3:00
|-  style="background:#fbb;"
| 2010-06-04 ||Loss||align=left|  Siangmorakot Kiatrachanok || Lumpinee Stadium || Bangkok, Thailand || Decision || 5 || 3:00
|-  style="background:#cfc;"
| 2010-05-07 ||Win||align=left|  Petmai Sor.Arisa || Lumpinee Stadium || Bangkok, Thailand || Decision || 5 || 3:00
|-  style="background:#cfc;"
| 2010-02-16 ||Win||align=left| Thongchai Sor.Tummarungsi || Lumpinee Stadium || Bangkok, Thailand || Decision || 5 || 3:00
|-  style="background:#fbb;"
| 2010-01-02 ||Loss||align=left| Meknoi Sor.Darnchai || Omnoi Stadium || Bangkok, Thailand || Decision || 5 || 3:00
|-  style="background:#cfc;"
| 2009-11-24 ||Win||align=left|  Denvittaya Petsimean	 || Lumpinee Stadium || Bangkok, Thailand || Decision || 5 || 3:00
|-  style="background:#fbb;"
| 2009-03-21 ||Loss||align=left| Kiatsak Sit-oodpiboon || Lumpinee Stadium || Bangkok, Thailand || Decision || 5 || 3:00
|-
| colspan=9 | Legend:

References

Kwankhao Mor.Ratanabandit
Living people
1995 births
Kwankhao Mor.Ratanabandit